Russell Waugh (born 29 September 1941) is an Australian cricketer. He played fourteen first-class matches for New South Wales and Western Australia between 1960/61 and 1963/64.

See also
 List of New South Wales representative cricketers
 List of Western Australia first-class cricketers

References

External links
 

1941 births
Living people
Australian cricketers
New South Wales cricketers
Western Australia cricketers
Cricketers from Sydney